Greeley-Evans Weld County School District 6 (also called Greeley-Evans School District 6) is a school district headquartered in Greeley, Colorado, United States. The district serves most of the City of Greeley, the City of Evans, the Town of Garden City, and unincorporated areas in Weld County, including Auburn.

Schools
The following schools are operated by or through Greeley-Evans School District 6:

High schools

Zoned schools
 Greeley Central High School (Greeley)
 Greeley West High School (Greeley)
 Northridge High School (Greeley)

Other high schools
 Greeley Alternative Program (Greeley)
 Jefferson High School (Greeley)
 Early College Academy (Greeley)

K-8
The following schools teach kindergarten through eighth grade:
 Bella Romero Academy (Greeley, split into K-3 and 4-8)
Extraction Oil and Gas has been operating a fracking platform of 24 wells within 700 feet from the playground of the Bella Romero Academy. The controversial business activity has also been featured in stories from The New York Times, Mother Jones and others.
In June 2020, a petition was submitted to shut down the fracking platform. Children and teachers were exposed to benzene levels from the fracking operations almost seven times higher than the lifetime safe exposure level for benzene by the World Health Organization.
 Chappellow K-8 Arts Magnet School (Evans)
 Fred Tjardes School of Innovation (Greeley)
 S. Christa McAuliffe S.T.E.M. Academy (Greeley)
 Winograd K-8 (Greeley)

Middle schools

Zoned schools
 Brentwood Middle School (Greeley)
 Franklin Middle School (Greeley)
 Heath Middle School (Greeley)
 Prairie Heights Middle School (Greeley)

Other middle schools
 Jefferson Junior High School (Greeley)

Elementary schools
 Centennial Elementary (Evans)
 Dos Rios Elementary (Evans)
 Heiman Elementary (Evans)
 Jackson Elementary (Greeley)
 Madison Elementary (Greeley)
 Maplewood Elementary (Greeley)
 Martinez Elementary (Greeley)
 Meeker Elementary School (Greeley)
 Monfort Elementary School (Greeley)
 Scott Elementary (Greeley)
 Shawsheen Elementary (Greeley)

Preschool sites
The school district operates preschools in Martinez, Scott, and Shawsheen elementary schools. Additionally, it has the following sites:
 Early Childhood University (Greeley)
 ABC East (Greeley)
 District 6 Early Childhood Preschool, Aims Campus (Greeley)

Affiliated charter schools
 Frontier Academy (Greeley, K-5, 6-12)
 Salida Del Sol Academy (Greeley, K-8)
 Union Colony Elementary (Greeley, K-5)
 Union Colony Preparatory (Greeley, 6-12)
 University Schools (Greeley, K-5, 6-8, 9-12)
 West Ridge Academy (Greeley, K-8)

Former Schools
 John Evans Middle School (Greeley, closed and students transferred to Prairie Heights Middle School in 2015)
 East Memorial Elementary School (Greeley, now Bella Romero Academy's K-3 building)

References

External links
 Greeley-Evans School District 6

Weld County School District 6
School District 6